Violence against women (VAW), also known as gender-based violence and sexual and gender-based violence (SGBV), are violent acts primarily or exclusively committed by men or boys against women or girls. Such violence is often considered a form of hate crime, committed against women or girls specifically because they are female, and can take many forms.

VAW has a very long history, though the incidents and intensity of such violence have varied over time and even today vary between societies. Such violence is often seen as a mechanism for the subjugation of women, whether in society in general or in an interpersonal relationship. Such violence may arise from a sense of entitlement, superiority, misogyny or similar attitudes in the perpetrator or his violent nature, especially against women.

The UN Declaration on the Elimination of Violence Against Women states, "violence against women is a manifestation of historically unequal power relations between men and women" and "violence against women is one of the crucial social mechanisms by which women are forced into a subordinate position compared with men."

Kofi Annan, Secretary-General of the United Nations, declared in a 2006 report posted on the United Nations Development Fund for Women (UNIFEM) website:Violence against women and girls is a problem of pandemic proportions. At least one out of every three women around the world has been beaten, coerced into sex, or otherwise abused in her lifetime with the abuser usually someone known to her.

Definition
A number of international instruments that aim to eliminate violence against women and domestic violence have been enacted by various international bodies. These generally start with a definition of what such violence is, with a view to combating such practices. The Istanbul Convention (Council of Europe Convention on preventing and combating violence against women and domestic violence) of the Council of Europe describes VAW "as a violation of human rights and a form of discrimination against women" and defines VAW as "all acts of gender-based violence that result in or are likely to result in physical, sexual, psychological or economic harm or suffering to women, including threats of such acts, coercion or arbitrary deprivation of liberty, whether occurring in public or in private life.

The 1979 Convention on the Elimination of All Forms of Discrimination Against Women (CEDAW) of the United Nations General Assembly makes recommendations relating to VAW, and the Vienna Declaration and Programme of Action mentions VAW. However, the 1993 United Nations General Assembly resolution on the Declaration on the Elimination of Violence Against Women was the first international instrument to explicitly define VAW and elaborate on the subject. Other definitions of VAW are set out in the 1994 Inter-American Convention on the Prevention, Punishment, and Eradication of Violence against Women and by the 2003 Maputo Protocol.

In addition, the term gender-based violence refers to "any acts or threats of acts intended to hurt or make women suffer physically, sexually or psychologically, and which affect women because they are women or affect women disproportionately". Gender-based violence is often used interchangeably with violence against women, and some articles on VAW reiterate these conceptions by stating that men are the main perpetrators of this violence. Moreover, the definition stated by the 1993 Declaration on the Elimination of Violence Against Women also supported the notion that violence is rooted in the inequality between men and women when the term violence is used together with the term gender-based.

In Recommendation Rec(2002)5 of the Committee of Ministers to member states on the protection of women against violence, the Council of Europe stipulated that VAW "includes, but is not limited to, the following":

a. violence occurring in the family or domestic unit, including, inter alia, physical and mental aggression, emotional and psychological abuse, rape and sexual abuse, incest, rape between spouses, regular or occasional partners and cohabitants, crimes committed in the name of honour, female genital and sexual mutilation and other traditional practices harmful to women such as forced marriages;

b. violence occurring within the general community including, inter alia, rape, sexual abuse, sexual harassment and intimidation at work, in institutions or elsewhere trafficking in women for the purposes of sexual exploitation, and economic exploitation and sex tourism;

c. violence perpetrated or condoned by the state or its officials;

d. violation of the human rights of women in situations of armed conflict, in particular the taking of hostages, forced displacement, systematic rape, sexual slavery, forced pregnancy, and trafficking for the purposes of sexual exploitation and economic exploitation.

These definitions of VAW as being gender-based are seen by some to be unsatisfactory and problematic. These definitions are conceptualized in an understanding of society as patriarchal, signifying unequal relations between men and women. Opponents of such definitions argue that the definitions disregard violence against men and that the term gender, as used in gender based violence, only refers to women. Other critics argue that employing the term gender in this particular way may introduce notions of inferiority and subordination for femininity and superiority for masculinity. There is no widely accepted current definition that covers all the dimensions of gender-based violence rather than the one for women that tends to reproduce the concept of binary oppositions: masculinity versus femininity.

History

Overview

The history of violence against women remains vague in scientific literature. This is in part because many kinds of violence against women (specifically rape, sexual assault, and domestic violence) are under-reported, often due to societal norms, taboos, stigma, and the sensitive nature of the subject. It is widely recognized that even today, a lack of reliable and continuous data is an obstacle to forming a clear picture of violence against women.

Although the history of violence against women is difficult to track, it is clear that much of the violence was accepted, condoned and even legally sanctioned. Examples include that Roman law gave men the right to chastise their wives, even to the point of death, and the burning of witches, which was condoned by both the church and the state (although this was not a practice exclusively against women).

The history of violence against women is closely related to the historical view of women as property and a gender role of subservience. Explanations of patriarchy and an overall world system or status quo in which gender inequalities exist and are perpetuated are cited to explain the scope and history of violence against women. The UN Declaration on the Elimination of Violence against Women (1993) states, "violence against women is a manifestation of historically unequal power relations between men and women, which have led to domination over and discrimination against women by men and to the prevention of the full advancement of women, and that violence against women is one of the crucial social mechanisms by which women are forced into a subordinate position compared with men."

According to the UN, "there is no region of the world, no country and no culture in which women's freedom from violence has been secured." Several forms of violence are more prevalent in certain parts of the world, often in developing countries. For example, dowry violence and bride burning is associated with India, Bangladesh, and Nepal. Acid throwing is also associated with these countries, as well as in Southeast Asia, including Cambodia. Honor killing is associated with the Middle East and South Asia. Female genital mutilation is found mostly in Africa, and to a lesser extent in the Middle East and some other parts of Asia. Marriage by abduction is found in Ethiopia, Central Asia, and the Caucasus. Abuse related to payment of bride price (such as violence, trafficking, and forced marriage) is linked to parts of Sub-Saharan Africa and Oceania (also see Lobolo).

Certain regions are no longer associated with a specific form of violence, but such violence was common until quite recently in those places; this is true of honor-based crimes in Southern/Mediterranean Europe. For instance, in Italy, before 1981, the Criminal Code provided for mitigating circumstances in case of a killing of a woman or her sexual partner for reasons related to honor, providing for a reduced sentence.

Invoking culture to explain particular forms of violence against women risks appearing to legitimize them. There is also debate and controversy about the ways in which cultural traditions, local customs and social expectations, as well as various interpretations of religion, interact with abusive practices. Specifically, cultural justifications for certain violent acts against women are asserted by some states and social groups within many countries claiming to defend their traditions. These justifications are questionable precisely because the defenses are generally voiced by political leaders or traditional authorities, not by those actually affected. The need for sensitivity and respect of culture is an element that cannot be ignored either; thus a sensitive debate has ensued and is ongoing.

There has also been a history of recognizing the harmful effects of this violence. In the 1870s, courts in the United States stopped recognizing the common-law principle that a husband had the right to "physically chastise an errant wife". The first state to rescind this right was Alabama in 1871. In the UK the right of a husband to inflict moderate corporal punishment on his wife to keep her "within the bounds of duty" was removed in 1891.

In the 20th and 21st centuries, and in particular since the 1990s, there has been increased activity on both the national and international levels to research, raise awareness and advocate for the prevention of all kinds of violence against women. Most often, violence against women has been framed as a health issue, and also as a violation of human rights. A study in 2002 estimated that at least one in five women in the world had been physically or sexually abused by a man sometime in their lives, and "gender-based violence accounts for as much death and ill-health in women aged 15–44 years as cancer, and is a greater cause of ill-health than malaria and traffic accidents combined."

Certain characteristics of violence against women have emerged from the research. For example, acts of violence against women are often not unique episodes, but are ongoing over time. More often than not, the violence is perpetrated by someone the woman knows, not by a stranger. The research seems to provide convincing evidence that violence against women is a severe and pervasive problem the world over, with devastating effects on the health and well-being of women and children.

Milestones
Some of the most important milestones on the international level for the prevention of violence against women include:

The 1979 Convention on the Elimination of All Forms of Discrimination against Women (CEDAW), which recognizes violence as a part of discrimination against women in recommendations 12 and 19.
The 1993 World Conference on Human Rights, which recognized violence against women as a human rights violation, and which contributed to the following UN declaration.
The 1993 UN Declaration on the Elimination of Violence against Women was the first international instrument explicitly defining and addressing violence against women. This document specifically refers to the historically forever-present nature of gender inequalities in understanding violence against women. (Include current 2nd paragraph here). This Declaration, as well as the World Conference of the same year, is often viewed as a "turning point" at which the consideration of violence against women by the international community began to be taken much more seriously, and after which more countries mobilized around this problem.
The 1994 International Conference on Population and Development, linking violence against women to reproductive health and rights, and also providing recommendations to governments on how to prevent and respond to violence against women and girls.
In 1996, the World Health Assembly (WHA) declared violence a major public health issue, and included in the subtypes recognized were intimate partner violence and sexual violence, two kinds of violence often perpetrated as violence against women. This was followed by a World Health Organization (WHO) report in 2002 (see below). The UN also created the Trust Fund to Support Actions to Eliminate Violence Against Women. 
In 1999, the UN adopted the Optional Protocol to the Convention on the Elimination of All Forms of Discrimination against Women and designated 25 November as the International Day for the Elimination of Violence against Women. 
In 2002, as a follow-up of the WHA declaration in 1996 of violence as a major public health issue, the WHO published the first World Report on Violence and Health, which addressed many types of violence and their effect on public health, including forms of violence affecting women particularly strongly. The report specifically noted the sharp rise in civil society organizations and activities directed at responding to gender-based violence against women from the 1970s to the 1990s. 
In 2004, the WHO published its "Multi-country study on Women's Health and Domestic Violence against Women", a study of women's health and domestic violence by surveying over 24,000 women in 10 countries from all regions of the world, which assessed the prevalence and extent of violence against women, particularly violence by intimate partners, and linked this with health outcomes to women as well as documenting strategies and services that women use to cope with intimate-partner violence.
The 2006 UN Secretary General's "In-depth study on all forms of violence against women", the first comprehensive international document on the issue.
The 2011 Council of Europe Convention on preventing and combating violence against women and domestic violence, which is the second regional legally-binding instrument on violence against women and girls. 
In 2013, the United Nations Commission on the Status of Women (CSW) adopted, by consensus, Agreed Conclusions on the elimination and prevention of all forms of violence against women and girls (formerly, there were no agreed-upon conclusions).
Also in 2013, the UN General Assembly passed its first resolution calling for the protection of defenders of women's human rights. The resolution urges states to put in place gender-specific laws and policies for the protection of women's human rights defenders and to ensure that defenders themselves are involved in the design and implementation of these measures, and calls on states to protect women's human rights defenders from reprisals for cooperating with the UN and to ensure their unhindered access to and communication with international human rights bodies and mechanisms.

Additionally, on the national level, individual countries have also organized efforts (legally, politically, socially) to prevent, reduce and punish violence against women. As a particular case study, here are some developments since the 1960s in the United States to oppose and treat violence against women: 
1967: One of the country's first domestic violence shelters opened in Maine.
1972: The country's first rape help hotline opened in Washington, D.C.
1978: Two national coalitions, the National Coalition Against Sexual Assault and the National Coalition Against Domestic Violence, were formed, to raise awareness of these two forms of violence against women.
1984: The U.S. Attorney General created the Department of Justice Task Force on Family Violence, to address ways in which the criminal justice system and community response to domestic violence should be improved.
1994: Passage of the Violence Against Women Act or VAWA, legislation included in the Violent Crime Control and Law Enforcement Act of 1994, sponsored by then-Senator Joseph Biden, which required a strengthened community response to crimes of domestic violence and sexual assault, strengthened federal penalties for repeat sex offenders and strengthened legislative protection of victims, among many other provisions.
2000: President Clinton signed into law the VAWA of 2000, further strengthening federal laws, and emphasizing assistance of immigrant victims, elderly victims, victims with disabilities, and victims of dating violence.
2006: President Bush signed into law the VAWA of 2006, with an emphasis on programs to address violence against youth victims, and establishing programs for Engaging Men and Youth, and Culturally and Linguistically Specific Services.
2007: The National Teen Dating Abuse Hotline opened.
2009: President Obama declared April as Sexual Assault Awareness Month.
2013: President Obama signed into law the VAWA of 2015, which granted Native American tribes the ability to prosecute non-Native offenders, and regulated reports of sexual assault on college campuses.

Other countries have also enacted comparable legislative, political, and social instruments to address violence against women. Experts in the international community generally believe, however, that solely enacting punitive legislation for prevention and punishment of violence against women is not sufficient to address the problem. For example, although much stricter laws on violence against women have been passed in Bangladesh, violence against women is still rising. And violence against women has risen dramatically around the world since the late 2010s despite similar measures being taken in many regions as well as increased awareness and discussion of the subject. Instead, it is thought that wide societal changes to address gender inequalities and women's empowerment will be the way to reduce violence against women.

Effect on society
According to an article published in the Health and Human Rights journal, regardless of many years of advocacy and involvement of many feminist activist organizations, the issue of violence against women still "remains one of the most pervasive forms of human rights violations worldwide". The violence against women can occur in both public and private spheres of life and at any time of their life span. Violence against women often keeps women from wholly contributing to social, economic, and political development of their communities. Many women are terrified by these threats of violence and this essentially influences their lives so that they are impeded to exercise their human rights; for instance, they fear contributing to the development of their communities socially, economically, and politically. Apart from that, the causes that trigger VAW or gender-based violence can go beyond just the issue of gender and into the issues of age, class, culture, ethnicity, religion, sexual orientation, and specific geographical area of their origins.

Importantly, other than the issue of social divisions, gendered violence can also extend into the realm of health issues and become a direct concern of the public health sector. A health issue such as HIV/AIDS is another cause that also leads to violence. Women who have HIV/AIDS infection are also among the targets of the violence. The World Health Organization (WHO) reports that violence against women puts an undue burden on health care services, as women who have suffered violence are more likely to need health services and at higher cost, compared to women who have not suffered violence. Another statement that confirms an understanding of VAW as being a significant health issue is apparent in the recommendation adopted by the Council of Europe, violence against women in private sphere, at home or domestic violence, is the main reason of "death and disability" among the women who encountered violence.

In addition, several studies have shown a link between poor treatment of women and international violence. These studies show that one of the best predictors of inter- and intranational violence is the maltreatment of women in the society.

Sexual violence

Sexual harassment can be used to refer to any unwelcome range of actions with sexual overtones, including verbal transgressions. Sexual violence refers to the use of violence to obtain a sexual act, including, for example, trafficking. Sexual assault is forcing a physical sexual act on someone against their will, and when this involves sexual penetration or sexual intercourse it is referred to as rape.

Women are most often the victims of rape, which is usually perpetrated by men known to them. The rate of reporting, prosecution and convictions for rape varies considerably in different jurisdictions, and reflects to some extent the society's attitudes to such crimes. It is considered the most underreported violent crime. Following a rape, a victim may face violence or threats of violence from the rapist, and, in many cultures, from the victim's own family and relatives. Violence or intimidation of the victim may be perpetrated by the rapist or by friends and relatives of the rapist, as a way of preventing the victims from reporting the rape, of punishing them for reporting it, or of forcing them to withdraw the complaint; or it may be perpetrated by the relatives of the victim as a punishment for "bringing shame" to the family. Internationally, the incidence of rapes recorded by police during 2008 varied between 0.1 per 100,000 people in Egypt and 91.6 per 100,000 people in Lesotho with 4.9 per 100,000 people in Lithuania as the median. In some countries, rape is not reported or properly recorded by police because of the consequences on the victim and the stigma attached to it.

Economic exploitation

Women who are sex workers end up in the profession for several reasons. Some were victims of sexual and domestic abuse. Many women have said they were raped as working girls. They may be apprehensive about coming forward and reporting their attacks. When reported, many women have said that the stigma was too great and that the police told them they deserved it and were reluctant to follow police policy. Decriminilazing sex work is argued to help sex workers in this aspect.

In some countries it is common for older men to engage in "compensated dating" with underage girls. Such relationships are called enjo kōsai in Japan, and are also common in Asian countries such as Taiwan, South Korea, Hong Kong. The WHO condemned "economically coerced sex (e.g. school girls having sex with "sugar daddies" (Sugar baby in return for school fees)" as a form of violence against women.

Women as sexual payment

Military exploitation

Militarism produces special environments that allow for increased violence against women. War rapes have accompanied warfare in virtually every known historical era. Rape in the course of war is mentioned multiple times in the Bible: "For I will gather all the nations against Jerusalem to battle, and the city shall be taken and the houses plundered and the women raped..." "Their little children will be dashed to death before their eyes. Their homes will be sacked, and their wives will be raped."

War rapes are rapes committed by soldiers, other combatants or civilians during armed conflict or war, or during military occupation, distinguished from sexual assaults and rape committed amongst troops in military service. It also covers the situation where women are forced into prostitution or sexual slavery by an occupying power. During World War II the Japanese military established brothels filled with "comfort women", girls and women who were forced into sexual slavery for soldiers, exploiting women for the purpose of creating access and entitlement for men. People rarely tried to explain why rape happens in wars. One explanation that was floated around was that men in war have "urges".

Another example of violence against women incited by militarism during war took place in the Kovno Ghetto. Jewish male prisoners had access to (and used) Jewish women forced into camp brothels by the Nazis, who also used them.

Rape during the Bangladesh Liberation War by members of the Pakistani military and the militias that supported them led to 200,000 women raped over a period of nine months. Rape during the Bosnian War was used as a highly systematized instrument of war by Serb armed forces predominantly targeting women and girls of the Bosniak ethnic group for physical and moral destruction. Estimates of the number of women raped during the war range from 50,000 to 60,000; as of 2010 only 12 cases have been prosecuted.

The 1998 International Criminal Tribunal for Rwanda recognized rape in the Rwandan Genocide as a war crime. Presiding judge Navanethem Pillay said in a statement after the verdict: "From time immemorial, rape has been regarded as spoils of war. Now it will be considered a war crime. We want to send out a strong message that rape is no longer a trophy of war."

According to one report, the Islamic State of Iraq and the Levant's capture of Iraqi cities in June 2014 was accompanied by an upsurge in crimes against women, including kidnap and rape. The Guardian reported that ISIL's extremist agenda extended to women's bodies and that women living under their control were being captured and raped. Fighters are told that they are free to have sex and rape non-Muslim captive women. Yazidi girls in Iraq allegedly raped by ISIL fighters committed suicide by jumping to their death from Mount Sinjar, as described in a witness statement. Haleh Esfandiari from the Woodrow Wilson International Center for Scholars has highlighted the abuse of local women by ISIL militants after they have captured an area. "They usually take the older women to a makeshift slave market and try to sell them. The younger girls ... are raped or married off to fighters", she said, adding, "It's based on temporary marriages, and once these fighters have had sex with these young girls, they just pass them on to other fighters." Describing the Yazidi women captured by ISIS, Nazand Begikhani said "[t]hese women have been treated like cattle... They have been subjected to physical and sexual violence, including systematic rape and sex slavery. They've been exposed in markets in Mosul and in Raqqa, Syria, carrying price tags." In December 2014 the Iraqi Ministry of Human Rights announced that the Islamic State of Iraq and the Levant had killed over 150 women and girls in Fallujah who refused to participate in sexual jihad.

During the Rohingya genocide (2016–present) the Armed Forces of Myanmar, along with the Myanmar Border Guard Police and Buddhist militias of Rakhine, committed widespread gang rapes and other forms of sexual violence against the Rohingya Muslim women and girls. A January 2018 study estimated that the military and local Rakhine Buddhists perpetrated gang rapes and other forms of sexual violence against 18,000 Rohingya Muslim women and girls. The Human Rights Watch stated that the gang rapes and sexual violence were committed as part of the military's ethnic cleansing campaign while the United Nations Special Representative of the Secretary General on Sexual Violence in Conflict Pramila Patten said that the Rohingya women and girls were made the "systematic" target of rapes and sexual violence because of their ethnic identity and religion. Other forms of sexual violence included sexual slavery in military captivity, forced public nudity, and humiliation. Some women and girls were raped to death while others were found traumatised with raw wounds after they had arrived in refugee camps in Bangladesh. Human Rights Watch reported of a 15-year-old girl who was ruthlessly dragged on the ground for over 50 feet and then was raped by 10 Burmese soldiers.

Forced prostitution

Human trafficking refers to the acquisition of persons by improper means such as force, fraud or deception, with the aim of exploiting them. The Protocol to Prevent, Suppress and Punish Trafficking in Persons, especially Women and Children states,

Because of the illegal nature of trafficking, reliable data on its extent is very limited. The WHO states "Current evidence strongly suggests that those who are trafficked into the sex industry and as domestic servants are more likely to be women and children."
A 2006 study in Europe on trafficked women found that the women were subjected to serious forms of abuse, such as physical or sexual violence, that affected their physical and mental health.

Forced prostitution is prostitution that takes place as a result of coercion by a third party. In forced prostitution, the party/parties who force the victim to be subjected to unwanted sexual acts exercise control over the victim.

Intimate partner related violence
While "domestic violence" or "family violence" can be used to refer to violence between any family members, intimate partner violence refers to violence between intimate partners.

Violence related to acquiring a partner

Single women and women who are economically independent have been vilified by certain groups of men. In Hassi Messaoud in Algeria in 2001, mobs targeted single women, attacking 95 and killing at least six and, in 2011, similar attacks happened again throughout Algeria. 

Stalking is unwanted or obsessive attention by an individual or group toward another person, often manifested through persistent harassment, intimidation, or following/monitoring of the victim. Stalking is often understood as "course of conduct directed at a specific person that would cause a reasonable person to feel fear". Although stalkers are frequently portrayed as being strangers, they are most often known people, such as former or current partners, friends, colleagues or acquaintances. In the U.S., a survey by NVAW found that only 23% of female victims were stalked by strangers. Stalking by partners can be very dangerous, as sometimes it can escalate into severe violence, including murder. Police statistics from the 1990s in Australia indicated that 87.7% of stalking offenders were male and 82.4% of stalking victims were female.

An acid attack is the act of throwing acid onto someone with the intention of injuring or disfiguring them. Women and girls are the victims in 75-80% of cases, and are often connected to domestic disputes, including dowry disputes, and refusal of a proposal of marriage, or of sexual advances. The acid is usually thrown at the faces, burning the tissue, often exposing and sometimes dissolving the bones. The long term consequences of these attacks include blindness and permanent scarring of the face and body. Such attacks are common in South Asia, in countries such as Bangladesh, Pakistan, India; and in Southeast Asia, especially in Cambodia.

Forced marriage

A forced marriage is a marriage in which one or both of the parties is married against their will. Forced marriages are common in South Asia, the Middle East and Africa. The customs of bride price and dowry, that exist in many parts of the world, contribute to this practice. A forced marriage is also often the result of a dispute between families, where the dispute is 'resolved' by giving a female from one family to the other.

The custom of bride kidnapping continues to exist in some Central Asian countries such as Kyrgyzstan, Kazakhstan, Uzbekistan, and the Caucasus, or parts of Africa, especially Ethiopia. A girl or a woman is abducted by the would be groom, who is often helped by his friends. The victim is often raped by the would be groom, after which he may try to negotiate a bride price with the village elders to legitimize the marriage.

Forced and child marriages are practiced by some inhabitants in Tanzania. Girls are sold by their families to older men for financial benefits and often girls are married off as soon as they hit puberty, which can be as young as seven years old. To the older men, these young brides act as symbols of masculinity and accomplishment. Child brides endure forced sex, causing health risks and growth impediments. Primary education is usually not completed for young girls in forced marriages. Married and pregnant students are often discriminated against, and expelled and excluded from school. The Law of Marriage Act currently does not address issues with guardianship and child marriage. The issue of child marriage is not addressed enough in this law, and only establishes a minimum age of 18 for the boys of Tanzania. A minimum age needs to be enforced for girls to stop these practices and provide them with equal rights and a less harmful life.

Dowry violence

The custom of dowry, which is common in South Asia, especially in India, is the trigger of many forms of violence against women. Bride burning is a form of violence against women in which a bride is killed at home by her husband or husband's family due to his dissatisfaction over the dowry provided by her family. Dowry death refers to the phenomenon of women and girls being killed or committing suicide due to disputes regarding dowry. Dowry violence is common in India, Pakistan, Bangladesh and Nepal. In India, in 2011 alone, the National Crime Records Bureau reported 8,618 dowry deaths, while unofficial figures suggest the numbers to be at least three times higher.

Violence within a relationship

Physical
Women are more likely to be victimized by someone that they are intimate with, commonly called "intimate partner violence" (IPV). Instances of IPV tend not to be reported to police and thus many experts find it hard to estimate the true magnitude of the problem. Though this form of violence is often considered as an issue within the context of heterosexual relationships, it also occurs in lesbian relationships, daughter-mother relationships, roommate relationships and other domestic relationships involving two women. Violence against women in lesbian relationships is about as common as violence against women in heterosexual relationships.

Women are much more likely than men to be murdered by an intimate partner. In the United States, in 2005, 1181 women were killed by their intimate partners, compared to 329 men. It is estimated that 30% or more of the women who are emitted to the ER could be victims of domestic violence

 In England and Wales about 100 women are killed by partners or former partners each year while 21 men were killed in 2010. In 2008, in France, 156 women were killed by their intimate partner, compared to 27 men. According to the WHO, globally, as many as 38% of murders of women are committed by an intimate partner. A UN report compiled from a number of different studies conducted in at least 71 countries found domestic violence against women to be most prevalent in Ethiopia. A study by Pan American Health Organization conducted in 12 Latin American countries found the highest prevalence of domestic violence against women to be in Bolivia. In Western Europe, a country that has received major international criticism for the way it has dealt legally with the issue of violence against women is Finland; with authors pointing out that a high level of equality for women in the public sphere (as in Finland) should never be equated with equality in all other aspects of women's lives.

The American Psychiatric Association planning and research committees for the forthcoming DSM-5 (2013) have canvassed a series of new Relational disorders, which include Marital Conflict Disorder Without Violence or Marital Abuse Disorder (Marital Conflict Disorder With Violence). Couples with marital disorders sometimes come to clinical attention because the couple recognize long-standing dissatisfaction with their marriage and come to the clinician on their own initiative or are referred by an astute health care professional. Secondly, there is serious violence in the marriage that is "usually the husband battering the wife". In these cases the emergency room or a legal authority often is the first to notify the clinician. Most importantly, marital violence "is a major risk factor for serious injury and even death and women in violent marriages are at much greater risk of being seriously injured or killed (National Advisory Council on Violence Against Women 2000)". The authors of this study add, "There is current considerable controversy over whether male-to-female marital violence is best regarded as a reflection of male psychopathology and control or whether there is an empirical base and clinical utility for conceptualizing these patterns as relational."

Recommendations for clinicians making a diagnosis of Marital Relational Disorder should include the assessment of actual or "potential" male violence as regularly as they assess the potential for suicide in depressed patients. Further, "clinicians should not relax their vigilance after a battered wife leaves her husband, because some data suggest that the period immediately following a marital separation is the period of greatest risk for the women. Many men will stalk and batter their wives in an effort to get them to return or punish them for leaving. Initial assessments of the potential for violence in a marriage can be supplemented by standardized interviews and questionnaires, which have been reliable and valid aids in exploring marital violence more systematically."
 
The authors conclude with what they call "very recent information" on the course of violent marriages, which suggests that "over time a husband's battering may abate somewhat, but perhaps because he has successfully intimidated his wife. The risk of violence remains strong in a marriage in which it has been a feature in the past. Thus, treatment is essential here; the clinician cannot just wait and watch." The most urgent clinical priority is the protection of the wife because she is the one most frequently at risk, and clinicians must be aware that supporting assertiveness by a battered wife may lead to more beatings or even death.

Sexual

Marital or spousal rape was once widely condoned or ignored by law, and is now widely considered an unacceptable violence against women and repudiated by international conventions and increasingly criminalized. Still, in many countries, spousal rape either remains legal, or is illegal but widely tolerated and accepted as a husband's prerogative. The criminalization of spousal rape is recent, having occurred during the past few decades. Traditional understanding and views of marriage, rape, sexuality, gender roles and self determination have started to be challenged in most Western countries during the 1960s and 1970s, which has led to the subsequent criminalization of marital rape during the following decades. With a few notable exceptions, it was during the past 30 years that most laws against marital rape have been enacted. Some countries in Scandinavia and in the former Communist Bloc of Europe made spousal rape illegal before 1970, but most Western countries criminalized it only in the 1980s and 1990s. In many parts of the world the laws against marital rape are very new, having been enacted in the 2000s.

In Canada, marital rape was made illegal in 1983, when several legal changes were made, including changing the rape statute to sexual assault, and making the laws gender neutral. In Ireland, spousal rape was outlawed in 1990. In the US, the criminalization of marital rape started in the mid-1970s and in 1993 North Carolina became the last state to make marital rape illegal.
In England and Wales, marital rape was made illegal in 1991. The views of Sir Matthew Hale, a 17th-century jurist, published in The History of the Pleas of the Crown (1736), stated that a husband cannot be guilty of the rape of his wife because the wife "hath given up herself in this kind to her husband, which she cannot retract"; in England and Wales this would remain law for more than 250 years, until it was abolished by the Appellate Committee of the House of Lords, in the case of R v R in 1991. In the Netherlands marital rape was also made illegal in 1991. One of the last Western countries to criminalize marital rape was Germany, in 1997.

The relation between some religions (Christianity and Islam) and marital rape is controversial. The Bible at 1 Corinthians 7:3-5 explains that one has a "conjugal duty" to have sexual relations with one's spouse (in sharp opposition to sex outside marriage, which is considered a sin) and states, "The wife does not have authority over her own body, but the husband does. And likewise the husband does not have authority over his own body, but the wife does. Do not deprive one another..." Some conservative religious figures interpret this as rejecting to possibility of marital rape. Islam makes reference to sexual relations in marriage too, notably: "Allah's Apostle said, 'If a husband calls his wife to his bed (i.e. to have sexual relation) and she refuses and causes him to sleep in anger, the angels will curse her till morning';" and several comments on the issue of marital rape made by Muslim religious leaders have been criticized.

Dating abuse or dating violence is the perpetration of coercion, intimidation or assault in the context of dating or courtship. It is also when one partner tries to maintain abusive power and control. Dating violence is defined by the CDC as "the physical, sexual, psychological, or emotional violence within a dating relationship, including stalking".

Widowhood related violence

In some parts of the world, widows are subjected to serious forms of abuse, often fueled by traditional practices such as widow inheritance. The sacrifice of widows (such as sati) has been prevalent historically in various cultures (especially in India). Although sati in India is today an almost defunct practice, isolated incidents have occurred in recent years, such as the 1987 sati of Roop Kanwar, as well as several incidents in rural areas in 2002, and 2006. Those likely to be accused and killed as witches are often widows. In parts of Africa, such as in Kenya, widows are viewed as impure and need to be 'cleansed'. This often requires having sex with someone. Those refusing to be cleansed risk getting beaten by superstitious villagers, who may also harm the woman's children. It is argued that this notion arose from the idea that if a husband dies, the woman may have performed witchcraft against him. Widow inheritance (also known as bride inheritance) is a cultural and social practice whereby a widow is required to marry a male relative of her late husband, often his brother.

Witch trials in the early modern period (between the 15th and 18th centuries) were common in Europe and in the European colonies in North America. Today, there remain regions of the world (such as parts of Sub-Saharan Africa, rural North India, and Papua New Guinea) where belief in witchcraft is held by many people, and women accused of being witches are subjected to serious violence. In addition, there are also countries that have criminal legislation against the practice of witchcraft. In Saudi Arabia, witchcraft remains a crime punishable by death.

Non-intimate partner family violence

Infanticide and abandonment

Son preference is a custom prevalent in many societies that in its extreme can lead to the rejection of daughters. Sex-selective abortion of females is more common among the higher income population, who can access medical technology. In China, the one child policy increased sex-selective abortions and was largely responsible for an unbalanced sex ratio. After birth, neglect and diverting resources to male children can lead to some countries having a skewed ratio with more boys than girls, with such practices killing an approximate 230,000 girls under five in India each year. The Dying Rooms is a 1995 television documentary film about Chinese state orphanages, which documented how parents abandoned their newborn girls into orphanages, where the staff would leave the children in rooms to die of thirst, or starvation.

Another manifestation of son preference is the violence inflicted against mothers who give birth to girls.

Body modification

Genitalia

Female genital mutilation (FGM) is defined by the World Health Organization (WHO) as "all procedures that involve partial or total removal of the external female genitalia, or other injury to the female genital organs for non-medical reasons".

The WHO states: "The procedure has no health benefits for girls and women" and "Procedures can cause severe bleeding and problems urinating, and later cysts, infections, infertility as well as complications in childbirth increased risk of newborn deaths".

According to a UNICEF report, the top rates for FGM are in Somalia (with 98 percent of women affected), Guinea (96 percent), Djibouti (93 percent), Egypt (91 percent), Eritrea (89 percent), Mali (89 percent), Sierra Leone (88 percent), Sudan (88 percent), Gambia (76 percent), Burkina Faso (76 percent), Ethiopia (74 percent), Mauritania (69 percent), Liberia (66 percent), and Guinea-Bissau (50 percent). FGM is linked to cultural rites and customs, including traditional practices. It continues to take place in different communities of Africa and the Middle East, including in places where it is banned by national legislation. According to a 2013 UNICEF report, 125 million women and girls in Africa and the Middle East have experienced FGM. Due to globalization and immigration, FGM is spreading beyond the borders of Africa and Middle East, to countries such as Australia, Belgium, Canada, France, New Zealand, the U.S., and UK.

Although FGM is today associated with developing countries, this practice was common until the 1970s in parts of the Western world, too. FGM was considered a standard medical procedure in the United States for most of the 19th and 20th centuries. Physicians performed surgeries of varying invasiveness to treat a number of diagnoses, including hysteria, depression, nymphomania, and frigidity. The medicalization of FGM in the United States allowed these practices to continue until the second part of the 20th century, with some procedures covered by Blue Cross Blue Shield Insurance until 1977.

As of 2016, in Africa, FGM has been legally banned in Benin, Burkina Faso, Central African Republic, Chad, Côte d'Ivoire, Djibouti, Egypt, Eritrea, Ethiopia, Gambia, Ghana, Guinea, Guinea Bissau, Kenya, Mauritania, Niger, Nigeria, Senegal, South Africa, Tanzania, Togo, Uganda, and Zambia. The Istanbul Convention prohibits female genital mutilation (Article 38).

Labia stretching, also referred to as labia elongation or labia pulling, is the act of lengthening the labia minora (the inner lips of the female genitals) through manual manipulation (pulling) or physical equipment (such as weights). It is often done by older women to girls.

Feet

Foot-binding was a practice in China done to reduce the size of feet in girls. It was seen as more desireable and was likely to make a more prestigious marriage.

Force-feeding

In some countries, notably Mauritania, young girls are forcibly fattened to prepare them for marriage, because obesity is seen as desirable. This practice of force-feeding is known as leblouh or gavage. The practice goes back to the 11th century, and has been reported to have made a significant comeback after a military junta took over the country in 2008.

Sexual initiation rites

Sexual "cleansing" is ceremony where girls have sexual intercourse as a cleansing ritual following their first menstruation and is referred to as kusasa fumbi in some regions of Malawi. Prepubescent girls are often sent to a training camp where women known as anamkungwi, or "key leaders", teach the girls how to cook, clean, and have sexual intercourse in order to be a wife. After the training, a man known as a hyena performs the cleansing for 12- to 17-year-old females for three days and the girl is sometimes required to perform a bare-breasted dance, known as chisamba, to signal the end of her initiation in front of the community.

Honor killings
Honor killings are a common form of violence against women in certain parts of the world. Honor killings are perpetrated by family members (usually husbands, fathers, uncles or brothers) against women in the family who are believed to have placed dishonor to the family. The death of the dishonorable woman is believed to restore honor. These killings are a traditional practice, believed to have originated from tribal customs where an allegation against a woman can be enough to defile a family's reputation. Women are killed for reasons such as refusing to enter an arranged marriage, being in a relationship that is disapproved by their relatives, attempting to leave a marriage, having sex outside marriage, becoming the victim of rape, and dressing in ways that are deemed inappropriate, among others. In cultures where female virginity is highly valued and considered mandatory before marriage; in extreme cases, rape victims are killed in honor killings. Victims may also be forced by their families to marry the rapist in order to restore the family's "honor". In Lebanon, the Campaign Against Lebanese Rape Law - Article 522 was launched in December 2016 to abolish the article that permitted a rapist to escape prison by marrying his victim.

Honor killings are common in countries such as Afghanistan, Egypt, Iraq, Jordan, Lebanon, Libya, Morocco, Pakistan, Saudi Arabia, Syria, Turkey, Yemen. Honor killings also occur in immigrant communities in Europe, the United States and Canada. Although honor killings are most often associated with the Middle East and South Asia, they occur in other parts of the world too. In India, honor killings occur in the northern regions of the country, especially in the states of Punjab, Haryana, Bihar, Uttar Pradesh, Rajasthan, Jharkhand, Himachal Pradesh and Madhya Pradesh. In Turkey, honor killings are a serious problem in Southeastern Anatolia.

Pregnancy-related violence

Obstetric violence refers to acts categorized as physically or psychologically violent in the context of labor and birth. A pregnant woman can sometimes be coerced into accepting surgical interventions or are done without her consent. This could include the "husband's stitch" in which one or more additional sutures than necessary are used to repair a woman's perineum after it has been torn or cut during childbirth with the intent of tightening the opening of the vagina and thereby enhance the pleasure of her male sex partner during penetrative intercourse. Several Latin American countries have laws to protect against obstetric violence. Reproductive coercion is a collection of behaviors that interfere with decision-making related to reproductive health.

Forced pregnancy

Forced pregnancy is the practice of forcing a woman or girl to become pregnant. A common motivation for this is to help establish a forced marriage, including by means of bride kidnapping. This was also used as part of a program of breeding slaves (see Slave breeding in the United States). In the 20th century, state mandated forced marriage with the aim of increasing the population was practiced by some authoritarian governments, notably during the Khmer Rouge regime in Cambodia, which systematically forced people into marriages ordering them to have children, in order to increase the population and continue the revolution.

The issue of forced continuation of pregnancy (i.e. denying a woman safe and legal abortion) is also seen by some organizations as a violation of women's rights. For example, the Committee on the Elimination of Discrimination against Women considers the criminalization of abortion a "violations of women's sexual and reproductive health and rights" and a form of "gender based violence".

Forced sterilization and forced abortion

Forced sterilization and forced abortion are considered forms of gender-based violence. The Istanbul Convention prohibits forced abortion and forced sterilization (Article 39). According to the Convention on the Elimination of all forms of Discrimination Against Women, all "women are guaranteed the right to decide freely and responsibly on the number of and spacing of their children, and to have access to information, education, and means to enable them to exercise these rights."

Studies show forced sterilizations often target socially and politically disadvantaged groups such as racial and ethnic minorities, the poor, and indigenous populations. In the United States, much of the history of forced sterilization is connected to the legacy of eugenics and racism in the United States. Many doctors thought that they were doing the country a service by sterilizing women who were poor, disabled, or a minority; the doctors considered those women to be a drain on the system. Native American, Mexican American, African American and Puerto Rican-American women were coerced into sterilization programs, with Native Americans and African Americans especially being targeted. Records have shown that Native American girls as young as eleven years-old had hysterectomy operations performed.

In Europe, there have been a number of lawsuits and accusations towards the Czech Republic and Slovakia of sterilizing Roma women without adequate information and waiting period. In response, both nations have instituted a mandatory seven-day waiting period and written consent. Slovakia has been condemned on the issue of forced sterilization of Roma women several times by the European Court for Human Rights (see V. C. vs. Slovakia, N. B. vs. Slovakia and I.G. and Others vs. Slovakia).

In Peru, in 1995, Alberto Fujimori launched a family planning initiative that especially targeted poor and indigenous women. In total, over 215,000 women were sterilized, with over 200,000 believed to have been coerced. In 2002, Health Minister Fernando Carbone admitted that the government gave misleading information, offered food incentives, and threatened to fine parents if they had additional children. The procedures have also been found to have been negligent, with less than half using proper anesthetic.

In China, the one child policy included forced abortions and forced sterilization. Forced sterilization is also practiced in Uzbekistan.

Violence in male-dominated spheres

In politics 
Violence Against Women in Politics (VAWP) is the act or threat of physical, emotional or psychological violence against female politicians on the basis of their gender, most often with the intent of discouraging the victims and other female politicians from participating in the political process. VAWP has been growing in significance among the fields of gendered political science and feminist political theory studies. The main intent behind creating a separate category that is distinct from Violence Against Women, is to highlight the barriers faced by women who work in politics, or wish to pursue a career in the political realm. While women's participation in national parliaments has been increasing, rising from 11% in 1995 to 25% in 2021, there is still a large disparity between male and female representation in governmental politics. Expanding women's participation in government is a crucial goal for many countries, as female politicians have proven invaluable with respect to bringing certain issues to the forefront, such as elimination of gender-based violence, parental leave and childcare, pensions, gender-equality laws, electoral reform, and providing fresh perspectives on numerous policy areas that have typically remained a male-dominated realm. In order to increase women's participation in an effective manner, the importance of recognizing the issues related to VAWP and making every effort to provide the necessary resources to victims and condemn any and all hostile behaviour in political institutions cannot be understated. Acts of violence or harassment are often not deemed to be gendered when they are reported. This ambiguity results in a lack of information regarding attacks and makes the issue appear to be relatively commonplace. While it is reported that women in politics are more often targeted by violence than their male counterparts, the specific cause is often not reported as a gendered crime. This makes it more difficult to pinpoint where the links between gender-specific violence and political violence really are. Gabrielle Bardell's 2011 report: "Breaking the mold: Understanding Gender and Electoral Violence" was one of the first documents published that showed examples and figures for how women are intimidated and attacked in politics. In many countries, the practice of electoral politics is traditionally considered to be a masculine domain. The history of male dominated politics has allowed some male politicians to believe they have a right to participate in politics while women should not. Violence against women in politics is typically attributed to a general anger towards women as a whole, with the intent of discouraging many women from participating after witnessing the treatment of other victims. Male politicians sometimes feel threatened by the prospect of a female politician occupying their position, which can cause them to lash out, and weak men do not want to feel as though women could be above them causing them to harass and threaten women in power. A number of male politicians tend to see women in politics as a challenge to the social order, which can cause them to lash out against women who hold governmental positions of power. "One of the gravest challenges that women are now facing as a result of their increased participation is political gender based violence against candidates and elected women politicians, Women are often subjected to threats, attacks, intimidation, physical and psychological violence and harassment by men just because they dare to speak up publicly in a patriarchal society."-Carolina Gottardo and Maria Eugenia Rojas
48% of electoral violence against women is against supporters, this is most likely the largest percentage as it has the largest amount of the public participating. 9% of electoral violence against women is targeting candidates, while 22% targets female voters. This means that women who are directly acting in politics are likely to face some form of violence, whether physical or emotional.

Higher education

Sexual violence on college campuses is considered a major problem in the United States. According to the conclusion of a major Campus Sexual Assault (CSA) Study: "The CSA Study data suggest women at universities are at considerable risk for experiencing sexual assault." Sexual violence on campus has been researched in other countries too, such as Canada, the UK, and New Zealand.

Sports
Sport-related violence against women is any physical, sexual, mental acts that are "perpetrated by both male athletes and by male fans or consumers of sport and sporting events, as well as by coaches of female athletes". The documenting reports and literature suggest that there are obvious connections between contemporary sport and violence against women. Such events as the 2010 World Cup, the Olympic and Commonwealth Games "have highlighted the connections between sports spectatorship and intimate partner violence, and the need for police, authorities and services to be aware of this when planning sporting events". Sport-related violence occurs in various contexts and places, including homes, pubs, clubs, hotel rooms, the streets. Violence against women is a topic of concern in the United States' collegiate athletic community. From the 2010 UVA lacrosse murder, in which a male athlete was charged guilty with second degree murder of his girlfriend, to the 2004 University of Colorado Football Scandal when players were charged with nine alleged sexual assaults, studies suggest that athletes are at higher risk for committing sexual assault against women than the average student. It is reported that one in three college assaults are committed by athletes. Surveys suggest that male student athletes who represent 3.3% of the college population, commit 19% of reported sexual assaults and 35% of domestic violence. The theories that surround these statistics range from misrepresentation of the student-athlete to an unhealthy mentality towards women within the team itself. Sociologist Timothy Curry, after conducting an observational analysis of two big time sports' locker room conversations, deduced that the high risk of male student athletes for gender abuse is a result of the team's subculture. Curry states, "Their locker room talk generally treated women as objects, encouraged sexist attitudes toward women and, in its extreme, promoted rape culture." He proposes that this objectification is a way for the male to reaffirm his heterosexual status and hyper-masculinity. Claims have been made that the atmosphere changes when an outsider (especially women) intrude in the locker room. In the wake of the reporter Lisa Olson being harassed by a Patriots player in the locker room in 1990, she said, "We are taught to think we must have done something wrong and it took me a while to realize I hadn't done anything wrong." Other female sports reporters (college and professional) have said that they often brush off the players' comments, which leads to further objectification. Some sociologists challenge this assertion. Steve Chandler says that because of their celebrity status on campus, "athletes are more likely to be scrutinized or falsely accused than non-athletes." Stephanie Mak says that "if one considers the 1998 estimates that about three million women were battered and almost one million raped, the proportion of incidences that involve athletes in comparison to the regular population is relatively small." In response to the proposed link between college athletes and gender-based violence, and media coverage holding Universities as responsible for these scandals more universities are requiring athletes to attend workshops that promote awareness. For example, St. John's University holds sexual assault awareness classes in the fall for its incoming student athletes. Other groups, such as the National Coalition Against Violent Athletes, have formed to provide support for the victims as their mission statement reads, "The NCAVA works to eliminate off the field violence by athletes through the implementation of prevention methods that recognize and promote the positive leadership potential of athletes within their communities. In order to eliminate violence, the NCAVA is dedicated to empowering individuals affected by athlete violence through comprehensive services including advocacy, education and counseling."

In the military
A 1995 study of female war veterans found that 90 percent had been sexually harassed. A 2003 survey found that 30 percent of female vets said they were raped in the military and a 2004 study of veterans who were seeking help for post-traumatic stress disorder found that 71 percent of the women said they were sexually assaulted or raped while serving.

Online
Cyberbullying is a form of intimidation using electronic forms of contact. In the 21st century, cyberbullying has become increasingly common, especially among teenagers in Western countries. On 24 September 2015, the United Nations Broadband Commission released a report that claimed that almost 75% percent of women online have encountered harassment and threats of violence, otherwise known as cyber violence. Misogynistic rhetoric is prevalent online, and the public debate over gender-based attacks has increased significantly, leading to calls for policy interventions and better responses by social networks like Facebook and Twitter. Some specialists have argued that gendered online attacks should be given particular attention within the wider category of hate speech. Abusers quickly identified opportunities online to humiliate their victims, destroy their careers, reputations and relationships, and even drive them to suicide or "trigger so-called 'honor' violence in societies where sex outside of marriage is seen as bringing shame on a family".
According to a poll conducted by Amnesty International in 2018 across 8 countries, 23% of women have experienced online abuse of harassment. These are often sexist or misogynistic in nature and include direct of indirect threats of physical or sexual violence, abuse targeting aspects of their personality and privacy violations.
According to Human Rights Watch, 90% of those who experienced sexual violence online in 2019 were women and girls.

Forms of violence
Violence against women can fit into several broad categories. These include violence carried out by individuals as well as states. Some of the forms of violence perpetrated by individuals are: rape, domestic violence, sexual harassment, acid throwing, reproductive coercion, female infanticide, prenatal sex selection, obstetric violence, online gender-based violence and mob violence; as well as harmful customary or traditional practices such as honor killings, dowry violence, female genital mutilation, marriage by abduction and forced marriage. There are forms of violence which may be perpetrated or condoned by the government, such as war rape; sexual violence and sexual slavery during conflict; forced sterilization; forced abortion; violence by the police and authoritative personnel; stoning and flogging. Many forms of VAW, such as trafficking in women and forced prostitution are often perpetrated by organized criminal networks. Historically, there have been forms of organized WAV, such as the Witch trials in the early modern period or the sexual slavery of the comfort women.

The WHO, in its research on VAW, has analyzed and categorized the different forms of VAW occurring through all stages of life from before birth to old age.

In recent years, there has been a trend of approaching VAW at an international level through means such as conventions or, in the European Union, through directives (such as the directive against sexual harassment, and the directive against human trafficking).

The Gender Equality Commission of the Council of Europe identifies nine forms of violence against women based on subject and context rather than life cycle or time period:
'Violence within the family or domestic violence'
'Rape and sexual violence'
'Sexual harassment'
'Violence in institutional environments'
'Female genital mutilation'
'Forced marriages'
'Violence in conflict and post-conflict situations'
'Killings in the name of honour'
'Failure to respect freedom of choice with regard to reproduction'

By age groups
The World Health Organization (WHO) has developed a typology of violence against women based on their cultural life cycles. 

Significant progress towards the protection of women from violence has been made on international level as a product of collective effort of lobbying by many women's rights movements; international organizations to civil society groups. As a result, worldwide governments and international as well as civil society organizations actively work to combat violence against women through a variety of programs. Among the major achievements of the women's rights movements against violence on girls and women, the landmark accomplishments are the "Declaration on the Elimination of Violence Against Women" that implies "political will towards addressing VAW " and the legal binding agreement, "the Convention on Elimination of all forms of Discrimination Against Women (CEDAW)". In addition, the UN General Assembly resolution also designated 25 November as International Day for the Elimination of Violence against Women.

A typology similar to the WHO's from an article on violence against women published in the academic journal The Lancet shows the different types of violence perpetrated against women according to what time period in a women's life the violence takes place. However, it also classifies the types of violence according to the perpetrator. One important point to note is that more of the types of violence inflicted on women are perpetrated by someone the woman knows, either a family member or intimate partner, rather than a stranger.

High risk groups

Indigenous people 
Indigenous women around the world are often targets of sexual assault or physical violence. Many indigenous communities are rural, with few resources and little help from the government or non-state actors. These groups also often have strained relationships with law enforcement, making prosecution difficult. Many indigenous societies also find themselves at the center of land disputes between nations and ethnic groups, often resulting in these communities bearing the brunt of national and ethnic conflicts.

Violence against indigenous women is often perpetrated by the state, such as in Peru, in the 1990s. President Alberto Fujimori (in office from 1990 to 2000) has been accused of genocide and crimes against humanity as a result of a forced sterilization program put in place by his administration. During his presidency, Fujimori put in place a program of forced sterilizations against indigenous people (mainly the Quechuas and the Aymaras), in the name of a "public health plan", presented 28 July 1995.

Bolivia has the highest rate of domestic violence in Latin America. Indigenous women self-report physical or sexual violence from a current or former partner at rates of twenty-nine percent, in comparison to the national average of twenty four percent. Bolivia is largely indigenous in its ethnic demographics, and Quechua, Aymara, and Guarani women have been monumental in the nation's fight against violence against women.

Guatemalan indigenous women have also faced extensive violence. Throughout over three decades of conflict, Maya women and girls have continued to be targeted. The Commission for Historical Clarification found that 88% of women affected by state-sponsored rape and sexual violence against women were indigenous.

The concept of white dominion over indigenous women's bodies has been rooted in American history since the beginning of colonization. The theory of manifest destiny went beyond simple land extension and into the belief that European settlers had the right to exploit Native women's bodies as a method of taming and "humanizing" them.

Canada has an extensive problem with violence against indigenous women, by both indigenous men and non-aboriginals. "[I]t has been consistently found that Aboriginal women have a higher likelihood of being victimized compared to the rest of the female population." While Canadian national averages of violence against women are falling, they have remained the same for aboriginal communities throughout the years. The history of residential schools and economic inequality of indigenous Canadians has resulted in communities facing violence, unemployment, drug use, alcoholism, political corruption, and high rates of suicide. In addition, there has been clear and admitted racism towards indigenous people by the Royal Canadian Mounted Police, making victims less likely to report cases of domestic violence.

Many of the issues facing indigenous women in Canada have been addressed via the Murdered and Missing Indigenous Women (MMIW) initiatives. Thousands of Native Canadian women have gone missing or been killed in the past 30 years, with little representation or attention from the government. Efforts to make the Canadian public aware of these women's disappearances have mostly been led by Aboriginal communities, who often reached across provinces to support one another. In 2015, prime minister Stephen Harper commented that the issue of murdered and missing indigenous women was "not high on our radar", prompting outrage in already frustrated indigenous communities. A few months later, Prime Minister Justin Trudeau launched an official inquiry into the Murdered and Missing Indigenous Women.

In the United States, Native American women are more than twice as likely to experience violence than any other demographic. One in three Native women is sexually assaulted during her life, and 67% of these assaults are perpetrated by non-Natives, with Native Americans constituting 0.7% of U.S. population in 2015. The disproportionate rate of assault to indigenous women is due to a variety of causes, including but not limited to the historical legal inability of tribes to prosecute on their own on the reservation. The federal Violence Against Women Act was reauthorized in 2013, which for the first time gave tribes jurisdiction to investigate and prosecute felony domestic violence offenses involving Native American and non-Native offenders on the reservation, as 26% of Natives live on reservations. In 2019 the Democrat House passed H.R. 1585 (Violence Against Women Reauthorization Act of 2019) by a vote of 263–158, which increases tribes' prosecution rights much further. However, in the Republican Senate its progress has stalled.

Immigrants and refugees
Immigrant and refugee women often face violence, both in the private sphere (by partners and other family members) and in the public sphere (by the police and other authorities). These women are often in a vulnerable position: they do not speak the language of the country they are in, they do not know its laws, and sometimes they are in a legal position where they may be deported if they make contact with the authorities. Women who seek protection from armed conflict in their countries of origin often face more violence while travelling to the destination country or when they arrive there. Women refugees face violence from both the journey facilitator and the detention center guards. Journey facilitator rapes in exchange for money for their passage where as male guards sexually violates in exchange for faster refugee case process. These women have already been through a lot in their country because of wars and political instability and now while in search of freedom they face all kind of gender based Violences.

Transgender women

Transgender women, especially transgender women of color, are at higher risk of experiencing violence than cisgender women. Trans women commonly experience intimate partner violence, with one study finding that 31.1% of trans people experience it, and another finding that half of all trans women experience it. Trans women also often face abuse by police, and transgender sex workers often face violence from clients. Trans women who are survivors of violence can have a harder time finding domestic violence shelters, as some shelters do not accept them. In 2018, more than two dozen transgender people were violently killed in the United States, most of them women of color.

Restrictions on freedom of movement
Women are, in many parts of the world, severely restricted in their freedom of movement.
Freedom of movement is an essential right, recognized by international instruments, including Article 15 (4) of CEDAW. Nevertheless, in some countries, women are not legally allowed to leave home without a male guardian (male relative or husband). Even in countries where there are no laws against women traveling alone, there are strong social norms, such as purdah – a religious and social practice of female seclusion prevalent especially among some Muslim and Hindu communities in South Asia. Many countries have laws on what type of clothing women may or may not wear in public (see Hijab by country). Women in some cultures are forced into social isolation during their menstrual periods. In parts of Nepal for instance, they are forced to live in sheds, are forbidden to touch men or even to enter the courtyard of their own homes, and are barred from consuming milk, yogurt, butter, meat, and various other foods, for fear they will contaminate those goods. (see Chhaupadi). Women have died during this period because of starvation, bad weather, or bites by snakes. In cultures where women are restricted from being in public places, by law or custom, women who break such restrictions often face violence.

Denial of medical care

Women in many parts of the world are often denied medical care. Denial of access to health assistance, along with denial of access to other services, is a form of socioeconomic violence against women. According to the WHO, "Discrimination in health care settings takes many forms and is often manifested when an individual or group is denied access to health care services that are otherwise available to others. It can also occur through denial of services that are only needed by certain groups, such as women."

Women may be denied medical care for numerous reasons, including lack of necessary freedom of movement allowing women to leave home so they can go to a medical facility, lack of financial resources, the need (in law or in practice) for a male relative or husband to consent to the medical care of the woman. A common consequence of denial of women's medical care is maternal mortality. Globally, there are more than 300.000 cases of maternal mortality yearly, with 99% of all maternal deaths occurring in developing countries.

Denial of medical care often occurs with regard to reproductive and sexual health. Sometimes women themselves avoid the medical system for fear of being reported to the police or facing family violence due to having premarital sex or being the victims of sexual violence. In some parts of Latin America, with very strict anti-abortion laws, pregnant women avoid the medical system due to fear of being investigated by the authorities if they have a miscarriage, or a stillbirth, or other problems with the pregnancy. Prosecuting such women is quite common in places such as El Salvador.

In developed societies, women face medial discrimination in that female health concerns are often dismissed or downplayed, especially when reproductive health is concerned. Research since 2001 has consistently shown that medical practitioners have been "dismissing, misdiagnosing, or cluelessly shrugging" at women seeking medical assistance.

Denial of medical care for women has led to the exclusion of female needs in medical research and diagnosis, leading to a male bias in medical trials at the expense of women's health.

State violence

Violence by the police and other authority figures

When police officers misuse their power as agents of the state to physically and sexually harass and assault victims, the survivors, including women, feel much less able to report the violence. It is standard procedure for police to force entry into the victim's home even after the victim's numerous requests for them to go away. Government agencies often disregard the victim's right to freedom of association with their perpetrator. Shelter workers are often reduced themselves to contributing to violence against women by exploiting their vulnerability in exchange for a paying job.

Human rights violations perpetrated by police and military personnel in many countries are correlated with decreased access to public health services and increased practices of risky behavior among members of vulnerable groups, such as women and female sex workers. These practices are especially widespread in settings with a weak rule of law and low levels of police and military management and professionalism. Police abuse in this context has been linked to a wide range of risky behaviors and health outcomes, including post-traumatic stress disorder (PTSD) and substance abuse. Extortion of sexual services and police sexual abuse have been linked to a decrease in condom use and an elevated risk of STI and HIV infections among vulnerable groups.

Stoning and flogging
Stoning, or lapidation, refers to a form of capital punishment whereby an organized group throws stones at an individual until the person dies. Stoning is a punishment that is included in the laws of several countries, including Iran, Saudi Arabia, Sudan, Pakistan, Yemen, the United Arab Emirates, and some states in Nigeria, as punishment for adultery. Flogging or flagellation is the act of methodically beating or whipping the human body. It is a judicial punishment in various countries for specific crimes, including sex outside marriage. These punishments employed for sexual relations outside marriage, apart from constituting a form of violence in themselves, can also deter victims of sexual violence from reporting the crime, because the victims may themselves be punished (if they cannot prove their case, if they are deemed to have been in the company of an unrelated male, or if they were unmarried and not virgins at the time of the rape).

Activism

Background and history
Activism refers to "a doctrine or practice that emphasizes direct vigorous action especially in support of or opposition to one side of a controversial issue". In the activism for violence against women, the objectives are to address and draw public attention on the issues of VAW as well as seek and recommend measures to prevent and eliminate this violence. Many scholarly articles suggest that the VAW is considered as a violation of human rights as well as "public health issue".

In order to better comprehend the anti-violence movements against VAW, there is a need to also understand the generic historical background of feminist movements in a holistic manner. Talking about the international women's movement, many feminist scholars have categorized these movements into three waves according to their different beliefs, strategies and goals.

The emergence of the first women's movements, or so called the first wave of feminism, dated back in the years the late 19th Century and early 20th Century in the United States and Europe. During this period, feminist movements developed from the context of industrialization and liberal politics that triggered the rise of feminist groups concerned with gaining equal access and opportunity for women. This wave marks a period of "suffrage, independence, rights to nationality, work and equal pay" for women.

The second wave of feminist movements was the series of movements from the period of the late 1960s to early 1970s. It was noted by feminist scholars that this wave could be characterized as a period of women's liberation and the rise of a branch of feminism known as radical feminism. This wave of feminism emerged in the context of the postwar period in society where other mainstream movements also played a large role; for instance, the civil rights movements, which meant to condemn capitalism, imperialism and the oppression of people based on the notions of race, ethnicity, gender identity and sexual orientation. This wave marks a period of equal rights at home and workplace as well as rights to development for the purposes of people of different races, ethnicities, economic statuses and gender identities.

The third wave of feminism is the newest wave of feminism led by young feminists whose understanding and context are of the globalized world order and the technological advances that have come with it. Also, this wave is a transition of the fall communism to more complex issues of new kinds of 'warfare', threats and violence. This new wave also "embraces ambiguity" and introduced a feminist approach of 'intersectionality' that includes the issues of race, gender, age, and class. Other than that, the third wave marks a period of feminism dealing with identity politics, body politics as well as the issues of violence.

Nonetheless, the VAW movement was initiated in the 1970s where some feminist movements started to bring the discussion on the issue of violence into the feminist discourse and that many other groups, on the national as well as international levels, had attempted to push for the betterment of women through lobbying of the state officials and delegates, demanding the conferences on 'gender issues' and thus made the VAW known to a wider range of population. Therefore, to put this into the theoretical context, VAW can be categorized along with the second and third waves of feminism which share a focus on violence.

VAW activist movements come in many forms, operating at international, national, and local levels and utilizing different approaches based on Health and Human Rights frameworks. The movements stemmed mostly from social movements and groups of women who see the need to create organizations to 'lobby' their governments to establish "sanctuaries, shelters" and provision of services that help protecting these victims, also called "battered women", from acts of violence. The term "battered women" was used in a number of VAW movements and had its root in the early stage of organizing efforts to tackle the problem of violence against women in many regions of the world such as Africa, Asia Pacific, Latin American and the Caribbean. The activist organizations against VAW, some with and the others without the support of their governments, attempted to develop "innovative efforts" to assist battered women by providing them services such as shelters and centers; drafting and lobbying governments to include the recognition and language of VAW into national legislations and international human rights instruments; advocating to raise the awareness of people via education and training sessions; forming national, regional as well as international networks to empower the movements; organizing demonstrations and gathering more efforts to end violent acts against women. In addition, many women's rights activist groups see the issue of violence against women as a central focus of their movements. Many of these groups take a human rights approach as the integral framework of their activism. These VAW movements also employ the idea that "women's rights are human rights", transform the concepts and ideas of human rights, which are mostly reckoned to be "Western concepts" and 'vernacularize them into the concepts that can be understood in their local institutions.

Levels of activist movements 

On the local or national level, the VAW movements are diverse and differ in their strategic program of intervention. The strategies used in a number of the movements focus on the individual level with the emphases on individuals, relationships and family. Also, many of them take the 'preventive' as an approach to tackle the issues on the ground by encouraging people to "reexamine their attitudes and beliefs" in order to trigger and create fundamental changes in these "deep-rooted beliefs and behaviors". Despite the fact that these strategies can be life changing, helpful to those who participate and feasible over a long time frame, the effects on societal level seem to be restricted and of minimal effects. In order to achieve the objectives of the movement, many activists and scholars argue that they have to initiate changes in cultural attitudes and norms on a communal level. An example of activism on the local level can be seen in South Africa. The movements of VAW in this context employ a strategy that is based on the 'prevention' approach, which is applicable on individual and societal levels: in families and communities. This movement encourages the individuals and small populations to rethink their attitudes and beliefs in order to create a possibility to alter these deep-rooted beliefs and behaviors, which lead to the acts of violence against women. Another example is the local level movement in East Africa that employs the prevention approach, which is applicable on a communal level. They call this a "raising voices" approach. This approach employs an 'ad hoc' framework that can be used alongside the individual approach where the strategy is to aggravate the status quo issues onto the individuals' and communities' perception and establish a common ground of interests for them to push for the movement, all in a short time period. In addition, on the domestic level, there seems to be many 'autonomous movements.' feminist movements (for VAW) can be understood as "a form of women's mobilization that is devoted to promoting women's status and well-being independently of political parties and other associations that do not have the status of women as their main concern".

A number of regions of the world have come together to address violence against women. In South America, the Southern Cone Network Against Domestic Violence has worked extensively to address sexual and domestic violence since 1989. The Latin American and Caribbean Network Against Domestic and Sexual Violence, formed in 1990, includes representation from twenty-one different countries and has been instrumental in increasing the visibility of VAW. In September 1999, the Heads of States of the Southern African Development Community (SADC) met and drafted the "Prevention and Eradication of Violence Against Women and Children", a document condemning violence against women and children, and resolved a set of 13 methods of addressing it, reaching into the legal; social, economic, cultural, and political; social service; and education, training, and awareness building sectors.

On the transnational or regional level, the anti-violence movements also deploy different strategies based on the specificities of their cultures and beliefs in their particular regions. On this level, the activist movements are known as "transnational feminist networks" or TFNs. The TFNs have a significant effect, like the autonomous movements on the national level, in shaping sets of policies as well pushing for the recognition and inclusion of language of VAW in the United Nations human rights mechanisms: the international human rights agreements. Their activities are ranging from lobbying the policy makers; organizing demonstrations on the local and regional levels; to creating institutional pressure that could push for changes in the international institutional measures.

On an international level, the movements that advocate for women's rights and against VAW are the mixture of (civil society) actors from domestic and regional levels. The objectives of these VAW movements focus on "creating shared expectations" within the domestic and regional levels as well as "mobilizing numbers of domestic civil society" to create "standards in global civil society". The global women's movement works to transform numbers of international conventions and conferences to "a conference on women's rights" by pushing for a "stronger language and clearer recognition" of the VAW issues. In addition, the United Nations also plays a vital role in promoting and campaigning for the VAW movements on the international level. For instance, in 2008 UN Secretary General Ban Ki-Moon initiated and launched a campaign called "UNiTE to End Violence against Women". This campaign "calls on governments, civil society, women's organizations, young people, the private sector, the media and the entire UN system to join forces in addressing the global pandemic of violence against women and girls". Moreover, this campaign also announces every 25th of the month to be "Orange Day" or "a day to take action to raise awareness and prevent violence against women and girls".

In conclusion, each level of activism is intertwined and has the common purpose to end violence against women. Activism on local levels can significantly affect national, transnational, and international levels as well. In a scholarly article on Combating Violence Against Women, the authors illustrated from their research analysis on how the norms of international society can shape and influence policy making on the domestic or national level and vice versa. They argue that there are three mechanisms which have effects on the making of national policies as well as global agreements and conventions: "1) the influence of global treaties and documents such as CEDAW on women's rights" on the national policies, "2) the influence of regional agreements on VAW (particularly after certain tipping points are reached)" on both domestic policies and international conventions and "3) regional demonstration effects or pressure for conformity captured as diffusion within regions" on the international norms and agreements.

Achievements of the VAW movements 
On the global level:
 The first major document that highlights the recognition of violence against women as a human rights violation: the United Nations Declaration on the Elimination of Violence Against Women in Vienna, 1993. It was a result of collective effort of global feminist movement to transform the Vienna conference from a general and mainstream human rights conference into the conference on women's rights. As before the other human rights organizations such as Amnesty International and Human Rights Watch did not focus on the issue of VAW and did not consider rape and domestic violence as violations of human rights despite the fact that they also have agenda on women's rights.
 The 1995 Fourth World Conference on Women in Beijing During the 4th Women Conference, VAW was emphasized and named as a critical concern. Also, the spillover effect was that this push highlighted the need for the development of "new international norms" that have often been used by activists and governments the proposition of legislation that provide other action to redress the acts of violence.
 Subsequently, the push from the global feminist movement also push for the fully incorporation of the VAW issues into the Committee on the Elimination of Discrimination Against Women (CEDAW) whereas the "original text of CEDAW in 1979 did not explicitly mention violence against women".

On the regional level:
 Americas: the Inter-American Convention on Violence Against Women, which was formally announced and adopted by the Organization of American States (OAS) in 1994, immediately after the Vienna Conference
 Europe: The European Union (EU)'s initiatives to combat violence against women after the 1990s: the 1997 resolution calling for a zero tolerance: specifically on UN human rights instruments of CEDAW and the Vienna Declaration.
 The Council of Europe also developed "a series of initiatives" related to the issue of VAW: "the 2000 resolution on trafficking, the 2003 resolution on domestic violence, and the 2004 resolution on honor crimes" as well as promoted "the 2002 recommendation on the protection of women against violence and established its monitoring framework".
 Africa: 
 There emerged a series of regional meetings and agreements, which was triggered by the UN processes on the international level such as Third World Conference on Women in Nairobi, 1985; the 1993 Kampala Prep Com; the 1994 Africa-wide UN women's conference that led to the identification of VAW as a critical issue in the Southern African Women's Charter.

Targeted campaigns 
In November 2021, Iamhere international, a group focused on increasing counter-speech on social media, started a 16-day campaign all forms of gender-based violence, in particular cyber violence.

Artists worldwide have addressed violence against women, highlighting the unique manifestations of violence across cultural and political histories. For example, Argentinian Italian artist Natalia Saurin (2020) responds to the Italian newspaper's use of love narratives to justify partner homicide in her mixed media postcard series, "Ti Amo Troppo". In the United States, artist street artist Sophie Sandberg encourages individuals to chalk their experiences of harassment in the places in which they occurred. Augmented reality comic "Priya's Shakti" addresses victim-blaming attitudes in India in response to the 2012 Delhi gang rape of a middle-caste college-educated woman. Through the utilization of Hindu mythologies, "Priya's Shakti" tells the story of a rape survivor in a controversial heroic role inviting Indian society to reckon with patriarchal societal views.
Artworks addressing violence against women span across artistic mediums and illuminate the issue of violence against women and provoke change in laws and government. In "And So I Stayed" (2021), a documentary film addressing unjustly incarcerated survivors of domestic violence in the United States, co-directors Natalie Pattillo, and Daniel Nelson confront the lack of legal understanding of abused women. As a result of the film, Pattillo and Nelson assembled a short film for the court case of Tanisha Davis, a survivor of domestic violence who was unable to receive leniency for the killing of her boyfriend despite years of physical and emotional abuse. In 2021, Tanisha Davis was released from prison thanks to the "Domestic Violence Survivor's Justice Act" and Pattillo and Nelson's nuanced portrait of Davis through their short film.

The "Violence Against Women Art Map" came to fruition in 2021 as part of a Pennsylvania State University research study to visualize artists' responses to violence against women. Featuring 24 artists globally, the map highlights the diverse ways in which women experience violence as a result of intersectional identity, culture, and history. The interactive digital map was co-created through a participatory action arts-based research methodology, using artist interviews and their artworks. Through visual mapping, artists addressing violence against women through their work connected transnationally for the purpose of coalition building.

Second order sexual harassment (SOSH)
Second-order sexual harassment (SOSH) is the harassment suffered by those who stand with and support victims of violence against women (VAW). Addressing this type of sexual harassment is basic to protect victims of gender violence.  According to scientific evidence, the most successful actions for overcoming gender violence are those that promote bystander intervention, thus it is necessary to protect the people who support the victims.  If society wants to empower victims to denounce and help them not to feel alone, it is necessary to ensure to protect persons who are actively protecting the victims for breaking the silence. 
There is pioneer legislation in the world regarding legal issues, In 2020 the Catalan Parliament passed the first legislation in the world against this form of violence under the name of Second-Order Violence.

Access to justice for female victims of violence

International and regional instruments
Efforts to fight violence against women can take many forms and access to justice, or lack thereof, for such violence varies greatly depending on the justice system. International and regional instruments are increasingly used as the basis for national legislation and policies to eradicate violence against women.

The Inter-American Convention to Prevent, Eradicate and Punish Violence Against Women – also known as the Belém do Parà Convention, for instance, has been applied by the Inter-American Commission on Human Rights (IACHR) in its first case of domestic violence to condemn Brazil in the Maria da Penha case. This led the Brazilian government to enact in 2006 the Maria da Penha Law, the country's first law against domestic violence against women. There is also, for instance, the South Asian Agreement on Regional Cooperation's (SAARC) Protocol to End Trafficking in Women and Children.

Examples of measures put in place
As violence is often committed by a family member, women first started by lobbying their governments to set up shelters for domestic violence survivors. The Julia Burgos Protected House established in Puerto Rico in 1979 was the first shelter in Latin America and the Caribbean for "battered women". In 2003, 18 out of the 20 countries in the region had legislation on domestic or family violence, and 11 countries addressed sexual violence in their laws. Legislative measures to protect victims can include restraining orders, which can be found in Colombia, El Salvador, Guatemala, Paraguay, Venezuela, Turkey, the United States and many western European countries for instance.

Courts can also be allowed by law (Germany, 2001) to order the perpetrator to leave the home so that victims do not have to seek shelter. Countries were urged to repeal discriminatory legislation by 2005 following the review of the Beijing Declaration and Platform for Action in 2000. Egypt, for instance, abolished a law that exempted men from rape charges when marrying their victims. However, the goal of antiviolence legislation is often to keep the families together, regardless of the best interests of women, which perpetuate domestic violence.

Innovative measures have been pioneered in a number of countries to end violence against women. In Brazil and Jordan, women's police stations have been introduced, and one-stop women's shelters were created in Malaysia and Nicaragua.

Marital rape has been illegal in every American state and the District of Columbia since 1993, but is rarely prosecuted in America.

In 2013 the UN General Assembly passed its first resolution calling for the protection of defenders of women's human rights. The resolution urges states to put in place gender-specific laws and policies for the protection of women's human rights defenders and to ensure that defenders themselves are involved in the design and implementation of these measures, and calls on states to protect women's human rights defenders from reprisals for cooperating with the UN and to ensure their unhindered access to and communication with international human rights bodies and mechanisms. The United Nations Sustainable Development Goal 5 is also a global initiative with a target to eliminate all forms of violence against women.

Challenges faced by women in accessing justice and limitations of measures 
There can be a de jure or de facto acceptance of violent behaviors and lack of remedies for victims.

Lack of criminalization: in many places, acts of abuse, especially acts such as female genital mutilation, marital rape, forced marriage and child marriage, are not criminalized, or are illegal but widely tolerated, with the laws against them being rarely enforced. There are instances where crimes against women are also categorized as minor offenses.
Lack of awareness of the existing laws: in many places, although there are laws against violence on the books, many women do not know of their existence. This is especially the case with marital rape – its criminalization being very recent in most countries.
Challenges in making a case in court: the burden of proof can be placed on the victim. For instance in the Philippines, before a change in law in 1997, rape used to be described as a crime against chastity; and virginity played an important role in court. In various countries, such as Bangladesh, a woman's past sexual experience continues to be very important in a case of rape. Bangladesh has received criticism for its employment of the "two-finger test" in rape investigations. This test consists in a physical examination of women who report rape during which a doctor inserts two fingers in the woman's vagina to determine whether the woman is "habituated to sex". This examination has its origin in the country's colonial-era laws dating back to 1872. The test deters many women from reporting incidents of rape. More than 100 experts, including doctors, lawyers, police, and women's rights activists had signed a joint statement in 2013 asking for the test, which they called "demeaning", to be abolished, as it "does not provide any evidence that is relevant to proving the offence". This test is also performed in several other countries in the region, including India. It can also be difficult to make a case of sexual assault in court, when members of the judiciary expect evidence of severe struggle and injury as determinative evidence of non-consent. On the other hand, there are measures, such as the 2012 law in Brazil, that allow for cases to be filed even without the representation of the victim.
Existing laws are insufficient, conflicting, and have no effect in practice: some laws on domestic violence, for instance, conflict with other provisions and ultimately contradict their goals. Legal frameworks can also be flawed when laws that integrate protection do so in isolation, notably in relation to immigration laws. Undocumented women in countries where they would have, in theory, access to justice, do not in practice for fear of being denounced and deported. The CEDAW Committee recommends that a State authority's obligation to report undocumented persons be repealed in national legislation.
The attitude of the police: women who report acts of violence most often come into contact first with police workers. Therefore, police attitudes are crucial in facilitating a sense of safety and comfort for women who have been victimized. When police officers have hostile attitudes towards victimized women, these women are prevented from obtaining justice. Recognizing these problems, some countries have enacted women's police station, which are police stations that specialize in certain crimes, such as sexual violence, harassment, domestic violence committed against women.

Measures to address violence against women range from access to legal-aid to the provision of shelters and hotlines for victims. Despite advances in legislation and policies, the lack of implementation of the measures put in place prevents significant progress in eradicating violence against women globally. This failure to apply existing laws and procedures is often due to the persisting issue of gender stereotyping.

Relation with marriage laws
 

The relation between violence against women and marriage laws, regulations and traditions has also been discussed. The US and English law subscribed until the 20th century to the system of coverture, that is, a legal doctrine under which, upon marriage, a woman's legal rights were subsumed by those of her husband. Today, outside the West, many countries severely restrict the rights of married women: for example, in Yemen, marriage regulations state that a wife must obey her husband and must not leave home without his permission. In Iraq husbands have a legal right to "punish" their wives. The criminal code states at Paragraph 41 that there is no crime if an act is committed while exercising a legal right; examples of legal rights include: "The punishment of a wife by her husband, the disciplining by parents and teachers of children under their authority within certain limits prescribed by law or by custom". In the West, married women faced discrimination until just a few decades ago: for instance, in France, married women received the right to work without their husband's permission in 1965. In Spain, during the Franco era, a married woman required her husband's consent (permiso marital) for nearly all economic activities, including employment, ownership of property and traveling away from home; the permiso marital was abolished in 1975. Concerns exist about violence related to marriage – both inside marriage (physical abuse, sexual violence, restriction of liberty) and in relation to marriage customs (dowry, bride price, forced marriage, child marriage, marriage by abduction, violence related to female premarital virginity). Claudia Card, professor of philosophy at the University of Wisconsin-Madison, writes:
The legal rights of access that married partners have to each other's persons, property, and lives makes it all but impossible for a spouse to defend herself (or himself), or to be protected against torture, rape, battery, stalking, mayhem, or murder by the other spouse... Legal marriage thus enlists state support for conditions conducive to murder and mayhem.

Istanbul Convention
The Council of Europe Convention on preventing and combating violence against women and domestic violence, also known as the Istanbul Convention, is the first legally binding instrument in Europe in the field of domestic violence and violence against women, and came into force in 2014.
Countries which ratify it must ensure that the forms of violence defined in its text are outlawed. In its Preamble, the Convention states that "the realisation of de jure and de facto equality between women and men is a key element in the prevention of violence against women". The convention also provides a definition of domestic violence as "all acts of physical, sexual, psychological or economic violence that occur within the family or domestic unit or between former or current spouses or partners, whether or not the perpetrator shares or has shared the same residence with the victim". Although it is a Convention of the Council of Europe, it is open to accession by any country.

See also

References

Further reading
 
 
  Pdf.
 

  Discussion Paper No. 255
  
  
  Pdf.
 
  Pdf.

External links

 Violence against women, a factsheet on ECtHR case law
 Virtual Knowledge Centre to End Violence against Women and Girls (in English, French, and Spanish)
 UN Special Rapporteur on violence against women, its causes and consequences
 World Health Organization's reports on FGM, Health complications of female genital mutilation

 
Sex industry
Feminism and health
 
Crimes against women